Carns Cairn is a cairn and National Monument located in County Sligo, Ireland.

Location
Carns Cairn is located in Carns Forest between Sligo town and Lough Gill.

History
The cairn is believed to date back to c. 3000 BC, the Neolithic, making it contemporaneous with Queen Maeve's Cairn atop Knocknarea.

Description

References

National Monuments in County Sligo
Archaeological sites in County Sligo